Haidergarh is a town and a nagar panchayat in the Barabanki district in the Indian state of Uttar Pradesh.

Major Education System in HAIDERGARH

1- St. Xavier school

2- Gramyanchal Secondary Education

3- st. Mother Teresa School

4- Pure Education by A.G.M

5- PAST Education Group

6- Modern Children Public School Principal Pradeep Tiwari ( share border with Haidergarh and Maharjganj )

Demographics 
 Indian census, Haidergarh had a population of 17,200. Males constitute for 53% of the population and females 47%. Haidergarh has an average literacy rate of 58%, lower than the national average of 59.5%: male literacy is at 64%, and female literacy is at 51%. In Haidergarh, 18.0% of the population is under 6 years of age.

Location
The town Haidergarh is located on Lucknow-Varanasi Highway. It is situated about 55 km from Lucknow and is well-connected by rail and road networks. Haidergarh is accessible from Ayodhya (70 km), Varanasi (215 km), as well as Raibareli (60 km).

TEMPLE'S OF HAIDERGARH
A temple of Lord Shiva named 'Avasaneshwar Mahadev' is situated on the bank of river Gomti. A foreign invader is said to have attacked the temple to damage the Shiv Lingam, but he was driven out by the stings of the bees and insects. 

The temple of Lord Shiva named "Rameshvaram shivala" is also situated in Thatharahi Ward of Haidergarh.
A holy Shiv temple named Killeshwar Mahadev near Haidergarh on Raebareli Road in Village Killa Post Ansari is very famous and special pooja is organized on Shiv Ratri.

And there is a beautiful Lordess Durga and Kaali Temple, known as SHITLA MANDIR.

Located on Bramnahn Ward

IN THE AVASANESHWAR MHADEV IS ALSO KNOWN AS MAHADEVAN

In this temple at the time of SHIV-RATRI. There is huge crowd in the temple and as much as 5 km traffic will be held and many police men and officers are there for handling.

Industries
Industry in Haidergarh comprises a sugar mill in the village of Pokhra. The mill has its own 2MW power plant. The education sector in Haidergarh is rapidly expanding. Tehsil has 4 institutions for higher education  (Gramyanchal Vidyalaya, Baijnath Sivkala Mahavidyalaya, Sarswati Vidya Mandir, Malka Degree College and Lal Bahadur Ganga Devi Mahavidyalaya). A rising institution of the town is the primary education centre Kids Galaxy School. Haidergarh is just 30km from the industrial area of Jagdishpur, where Bhel is situated.

References 

Cities and towns in Barabanki district